Andrew Miller (born 1836) was a sergeant serving in the United States Marine Corps during the American Civil War who received the Medal of Honor for his actions in the Battle of Mobile Bay.

Biography
Miller was born in 1836 in Germany, and entered the Marine Corps from Washington, D.C., August 21, 1854. He was a sergeant assigned to the marine detachment aboard the USS Richmond when it was sent to fight in the American Civil War during the Battle of Mobile Bay.

He was initially discharged from the Marine Corps August 21, 1858, but went on to serve three more enlistments. He honorably discharged the final time on October 20, 1866.

Medal of Honor citation
Rank and organization: Sergeant, U.S. Marine Corps. Born: 1836, Germany. Accredited to: Washington, D.C. G.O. No.: 45, 31 December 1864.

Citation:

As captain of a gun on board the U.S.S. Richmond during action against rebel forts and gunboats and with the ram Tennessee in Mobile Bay, 5 August 1864. Despite damage to his ship and the loss of several men on board as enemy fire raked her decks, Sgt. Miller fought his gun with skill and courage throughout the furious 2-hour battle which resulted in the surrender of the rebel ram Tennessee and in the damaging and destruction of batteries at Fort Morgan.

See also

List of American Civil War Medal of Honor recipients: M–P

References

External links

Year of death missing
United States Marine Corps Medal of Honor recipients
United States Marines
Union Marines
People of Washington, D.C., in the American Civil War
German emigrants to the United States
German-born Medal of Honor recipients
1836 births
American Civil War recipients of the Medal of Honor